Espen Udjus Frorud (born 10 April 1991) is a Norwegian cross-country skier.

He made his World Cup debut in March 2016 in the Holmenkollen 50 km race, also collecting his first World Cup points with a 21st place. His next World Cup outing was the 2017 edition of the same race where he finished 23rd.

He represents the sports club Skiptvet IL.

Cross-country skiing results
All results are sourced from the International Ski Federation (FIS).

World Cup

Season standings

References 

1991 births
Living people
People from Østfold
Norwegian male cross-country skiers
Sportspeople from Viken (county)